Kadampara is a village situated on a river island in the Cuttack district, in the state of Odisha, India. The island is called 42 Mouza, meaning Group of 42 Villages. The other neighbourly villages of Kadampara are Aitalanga, Dadhibamanpur, Baulakuda and Jhinkiria.

Facilities
Kadampara is one of the unique villages with facilities like a high school, Sudarshan Mahavidyalaya college, a cold store which is the biggest in eastern India, and its own youth club. The literacy rate of this village is nearly 74 percent.

A small canal called 'Malia' (now, a stagnant water body) is the lifeline of the agrarian village. Inhabitants of the village use the canal water for irrigation, pisciculture and bathing purposes. River 'Sidhua' (a tributary of Kathajodi) flows with a sweet murmur on the westernside of the village.

Religion
Krishna, or Lord Viswanath, is worshipped as the village deity. Kadampara celebrates 'Dolyatra' with much pomp and victory in mid-March beforeHoli. The village also houses a 'Satsang Kendra'.

References

External links
Pictures of the village
Website Of 42 MOUZA (Bayalish Mouja)
Sudarsan Mahavidyalaya 42 Mauza Cuttack Website

Villages in Cuttack district